The 2008 CAR Development Trophy, also known as the 2008 Africa Junior Trophy, was the fifth edition of second level rugby union tournament in Africa. The competition involved thirteen teams that are divided into three zones (North, center and South). In the north there were two pools of three teams. In the 2008 edition Botswana, Swaziland and Nigeria did not participate, due to involvement in the World Cup qualifiers.

Southern Tournament 

Was hosted by Mauritius.
Was held from 30 June through to 6 July when the final took place.
{| class="wikitable"
|-
!width=165|Team
!width=30|P
!width=30|W
!width=30|D
!width=30|Lost
!width=30|For
!width=30|Ag.
!width=30|Bonus
!width=30|Points
!width=200|Notes
|- bgcolor=#ccffcc align=center
|align=left| ||3||3||0||0||125||19||1||13||to 2009 Africa Thophy
|- align=center
|align=left| ||3||2||0||1||58||33||2||10||to 2009 Africa Thophy
|- align=center
|align=left| ||3||2||0||1||65||61||2||6||
|- align=center
|align=left| ||3||0||0||3||20||155||0||0||
|}

Center Tournament 

The tournament was played in Bujumbura, Burundi. 

 were replaced by Belgian club side Kibubu after they pulled out for financial reasons.

Northern Tournament

The tournament was hosted in Accra, Ghana

Pool A

Pool B

5th versus 6th Playoff

3rd versus 4th Playoff

Final

See also
CAR Castel Beer Trophy
Africa Cup

References

External links
Determined format by CAR

Sources
Burundi tournament results
Rwanda information
Tournament info

2008
2008 rugby union tournaments for national teams
2008 in African rugby union